Ángel Antonio Berni Gómez (9 January 1931 – 24 November 2017) was a football striker.

Career
Berni started his career at the youth divisions of Olimpia Asunción in 1945, and in 1949 he made the debut for Olimpia's first team. In 1951 he was transferred to Boca Juniors de Cali and later on played for Argentine clubs San Lorenzo de Almagro (where he became the top scorer for the 1954 season with 29 goals) and Gimnasia y Esgrima de La Plata. His last club was Real Betis of Spain.

At the national team level, Berni was part of the Paraguay squad at the 1950 World Cup and also competed in the 1953 Copa América tournament which was won by Paraguay.

References

Profile at Franjanegra
Jugadores de San Lorenzo

1931 births
2017 deaths
Sportspeople from Asunción
Paraguayan footballers
Paraguay international footballers
1950 FIFA World Cup players
Club Olimpia footballers
San Lorenzo de Almagro footballers
Club de Gimnasia y Esgrima La Plata footballers
Real Betis players
Expatriate footballers in Argentina
Expatriate footballers in Colombia
Expatriate footballers in Spain
Paraguayan expatriate footballers
Argentine Primera División players
Categoría Primera A players
Copa América-winning players
Association football forwards